Black Books is a British sitcom created by Dylan Moran and Graham Linehan, and written by Moran, Kevin Cecil, Andy Riley, Linehan and Arthur Mathews. It was broadcast on Channel 4, running for three series from 2000 to 2004. Starring Moran, Bill Bailey and Tamsin Greig, the series is set in the eponymous London bookshop and follows the lives of its owner Bernard Black (Moran), his assistant Manny Bianco (Bailey) and their friend Fran Katzenjammer (Greig). The series was produced by Big Talk Productions, in association with Channel 4.

The show was produced in a multiple-camera setup, and was primarily filmed at Teddington Studios in Teddington, London, with exterior scenes filmed on location on Leigh Street and the surrounding areas in Bloomsbury, London. The first episode was broadcast on 29 September 2000 and a total of three series were made, the final episode airing on 15 April 2004.

Black Books was a critical success, winning awards, including two BAFTAs (for Best Situation Comedy in 2001 and 2005) and a Bronze Rose at the Festival Rose d'Or.

Synopsis 
Bernard Black is the owner of Black Books, a small London bookshop. The series revolves around the lives of Bernard, Manny and Fran. Bernard's persona of a grouchy and misanthropic shopkeeper is a central theme; he has a hatred of the outside world and all the people who inhabit it, except for his best friend, Fran, who initially runs a trendy bric-a-brac shop, Nifty Gifty, next-door to the shop.

Bernard displays little interest or knowledge in retail (or, indeed, anything outside drinking, smoking and reading) and actively avoids having to interact with anyone, even inside his shop, as he has a seething dislike towards his customers who treat his bookshop more like a personal library. It is suggested that Fran and Bernard once slept together, but now they remain content to be friends (or possibly with Fran not allowing Bernard to remember), sharing a love of smoking heavily and drinking to excess. Fran otherwise is a hopeless romantic.

Manny is introduced in the first episode as an angst-ridden accountant who enters the bookshop seeking The Little Book of Calm. During a drunken night out, Bernard offers him a job as a shop assistant and a room above the shop if he will do Bernard's accounts for him. Sobering up, Bernard realises Manny's optimistic nature is not suited to this "kind of operation". Fran, however, seeing that Manny is good for Bernard, forces Bernard to let him stay.

Many episodes are driven by Manny and Fran's attempts to force Bernard into a more socially acceptable lifestyle. Their efforts usually result in chaos, sucking them back into Bernard's cynical view of the world. The bookshop, which also doubles as Manny and Bernard's residence, is frequently depicted as being in an unlivable state of dirtiness and often inhabited by animals and other unidentified creatures, while disorder is a frequent aspect of the running of the shop. Manny's attempts to improve both the shop and the residence often fail.

Cast 

The series revolves around the three main characters of Bernard Ludwig Black (Dylan Moran), Manny Bianco (Bill Bailey) and Fran Katzenjammer (Tamsin Greig), who all appear in every episode. Other characters appear briefly in single episodes, while the show also featured several guest stars, including actors Simon Pegg, Martin Freeman, Olivia Colman, Johnny Vegas, Nina Conti and writer Graham Linehan.

Production 

A pilot for the show was featured in the 1998 Channel 4 sitcom festival in Riverside Studios. This early version was decidedly darker, revolving around Bernard's, and later Manny's, decision to commit suicide. It featured Manny (surname Zimmerman in reference to Bob Dylan)  and the Fran character as Valerie, a philosophy lecturer.

The pilot was an original creation of Moran's and the series was his first creation as a writer for a television series. Linehan, co-writer of the earlier Channel 4 sitcom Father Ted, joined at the outset to co-write the series with Moran at the suggestion of producer William Burdett-Coutts after Linehan saw the pilot and had seen Moran performing in Dublin. The characters were Moran's original creation, created over a month-long process he calls "spitballing", which is talking spontaneously to each other in character.

The concept of Bernard owning a bookshop came about because of Moran's view of bookshops as doomed enterprises. Moran said "Running a second-hand bookshop is a guaranteed commercial failure. It's a whole philosophy. There were bookshops that I frequented and I was always struck by the loneliness and doggedness of these men who piloted this death ship", while Linehan said his belligerent personality reflected a sign he once saw in a bookshop stating "Please put the books anywhere you like because we've got nothing better to do than put them back". Moran said of the series, "We just wanted to cram as much elaborate stupidity into a half-hour that could make it be coherent and that you would believe".

The fictional address for the bookshop is Black Books, 13 Little Bevan Street, Bloomsbury, London WC1. Manny also states the shop is located "just off Russell Square". The exterior scenes of the bookshop were filmed outside a real bookshop, albeit a smaller one, called Collinge & Clark, located at 13 Leigh Street, Bloomsbury.

The audio commentary for Shaun of the Dead states that Black Books is considered by the producers to be a sister show of the 1999 Channel 4 sitcom Spaced, also produced by Nira Park. The show features several actors from Spaced, while in one episode Manny is heard speaking to Twist Morgan, a character from Spaced. Simon Pegg guest-starred as Bill Bailey's boss in another episode, an inversion of their roles in Spaced; Nick Frost appeared at the beginning of the episode "The Big Lockout" to install a new security system for the shop, though lost Manny's attention when he spotted a Subbuteo player in his hair; Kevin Cecil, one of the Black Books writers, appeared in Spaced playing the character of Harris; Jessica Stevenson made an appearance as a friend of Fran's, who was trying to help her live a healthier lifestyle with attempts to change her diet and get her to exercise more; Peter Serafinowicz played a radio broadcaster whose dulcet tones reading the shipping forecast drove Fran wild with desire; Omid Djalili appeared in "He's Leaving Home" as an opportunistic photographer; Rob Brydon appeared in Season 2's episode "The Fixer". Both Lucy Davis (The Office, Shaun of the Dead) and Olivia Colman (Peep Show, Hot Fuzz) appeared in Season 3's episode "Elephants and Hens".

Episodes

Original unaired pilot

Series 1 (2000)

Series 2 (2002)

Series 3 (2004)

Awards and reception 
Black Books won the BAFTA for Best Situation Comedy in 2001 and 2005, and won a Bronze Rose at the Festival Rose d'Or of Montreux in 2001. It also received nominations for British Comedy Awards and the Irish Film and Television Awards.

According to Allan Brown, writing for The Times in August 2005, the show was "killed off after three hugely popular series".

In Channel 4's "The World's Greatest Comedy Characters" poll, Bernard was voted 19th. The show ranked 58th out of 100 in the BBC's Britain's Best Sitcom poll in 2004.

Legacy
When asked by Digital Spy in 2015 about the show possibly returning, Moran replied saying "No, no, no, no! No! Does that answer the question, no!" and stated that he'd rather focus on new projects. He also said that he'd never do another studio sitcom again.

Notes

References

External links 

 
 
 
 .

2000 British television series debuts
2004 British television series endings
2000s British black comedy television series
2000s British sitcoms
2000s British workplace comedy television series
BAFTA winners (television series)
Bookstores in fiction
Channel 4 sitcoms
English-language television shows
Television series by Big Talk Productions
Television series by ITV Studios
Television series created by Graham Linehan
Television series set in shops
Television shows set in London
Television shows shot at Teddington Studios